Lars Paaske (born 18 January 1976) is a badminton player from Denmark.

Career
He competed in badminton at the 2004 Summer Olympics in men's doubles with partner Jonas Rasmussen.  After an initial bye in the first round, then were defeated in the next round by Yim Bang-eun and Kim Yong-hyun of Korea. Paaske then competed in the 2008 Summer Olympics in Beijing in men's doubles again with partner Jonas Rasmussen where they were chasing the one medal lacking in their collection: An Olympic medal. The pair lost in the semi final, and then again in the match for 3rd place to finish with a disappointing 4th spot.

Paaske won the gold medal at the 2008 European Badminton Championships in men's doubles with Jonas Rasmussen.

History
Lars Paaske had his breakthrough with Martin Lundgaard, they won Denmark Open in 1999 and repeated the success 2001.

In 2002 Paaske changed partner and paired with Jonas Rasmussen and this proved to be a good idea. While only in their second season, Passke and Rasmussen won the 2003 World Championship in Birmingham. This was the first time in 20 years that the title was won by Denmark. The same year, Paaske and Rasmussen achieved yet another historical result by winning China Open and were thereby the first Europeans to win the title. The following 12 months Paaske and Rasmussen held the number one position on the world ranking list. Lars Paaske and Jonas Rasmussen have never lost a match when representing the Danish National team in the Thomas Cup.

Lars Paaske played well on National ground, winning the Denmark Open MD title with Jonas Rasmussen in 2004 and 2006 and in 2007 they came second.

In 2008 Paaske became European Champion in MD and now Paaske and Rasmussen are chasing the missing medal in their collection, an Olympic medal. 
Lars Paaske represented Denmark in Sydney in 2000 together with Martin Lundgaard, in 2004 together with Jonas Rasmussen and in 2008 in Beijing also with Jonas Rasmussen.

In March 2010, Paaske and Rasmussen beat fellow countrymen Boe & Morgenson to win the All England Men's Doubles Title.

Achievements

World Championships 
Men's doubles

IBF World Grand Prix 
The World Badminton Grand Prix sanctioned by International Badminton Federation (IBF) from 1983 to 2006.

Men's doubles

References

External links
Pictures from Badminthonphoto.com
Pictures and articles from Daylife
Lars Paaske's Profile - Badminton.dk

1976 births
Living people
People from Hørsholm Municipality
Danish male badminton players
Badminton players at the 2000 Summer Olympics
Badminton players at the 2004 Summer Olympics
Badminton players at the 2008 Summer Olympics
Olympic badminton players of Denmark
World No. 1 badminton players
Sportspeople from the Capital Region of Denmark